Llandel Veguilla Malavé (born January 14, 1977), better known by his stage name Yandel, is a Puerto Rican reggaeton recording artist and record producer, who emerged in the music scene during late-1990s. He is best known as a member of the reggaeton duo Wisin & Yandel, active from 1998 to 2013, year in which they began a hiatus period in order to focus on their respective solo careers. Among several accolades, Wisin & Yandel are the only reggaeton acts to win both a Grammy and a Latin Grammy Award, both awards achieved for their 2007 studio album Los Extraterrestres.

After announcing his hiatus with Wisin, Yandel released two studio albums, an extended play and a live album. His studio albums, De Lider a Leyenda (2013) and Dangerous (2015), debuted at number-one on Billboards Top Latin Albums and both received Latin certifications by the Recording Industry Association of America (Gold and Platinum, respectively). Currently he is working on his upcoming album, Update, scheduled to be released during 2017.

As to accolades received as soloist, Yandel won 7 awards out of 51 nominations, including two Latin Grammy Awards (Best Urban Song and Best Urban Fusion/Performance), a Latin American Music Award for Album of the Year and a special award given by the Latin Songwriters Hall of Fame's board of directors.

American Society of Composers, Authors and Publishers Awards 

The ASCAP Awards are awarded annually by the American Society of Composers, Authors and Publishers in the United States.

|-
!scope="row"|2015
|"Moviendo Caderas"
|Latin Award-Winning Urban Songs
|
|-
!scope="row" rowspan="4"|2017
|"Encantadora"
|rowspan="3"|Latin Award-Winning Urban Songs
|
|-
|"Ay Mi Dios"
|
|-
|"El Perdedor"
|
|-
|"Imaginar"
|Latin Award-Winning Tropical Songs
|
|}

Billboard Latin Music Awards 

The Billboard Latin Music Awards are awarded annually by Billboard magazine in the United States. Yandel received no awards from seven nominations.

|-
!scope="row" rowspan="3"|2014
|rowspan="2"|Yandel
|Latin Rhythm Songs Artist of the Year – Solo
|
|-
|Latin Rhythm Albums Artist of the Year – Solo
|
|-
|De Líder a Leyenda
|Latin Rhythm Album of the Year
|
|-
!scope="row" rowspan="2"|2015
|rowspan="2"|Yandel
|Latin Rhythm Songs Artist of the Year – Solo
|
|-
|Latin Rhythm Albums Artist of the Year – Solo
|
|-
!scope="row" rowspan="2"|2016
|Yandel
|Latin Rhythm Albums Artist of the Year – Solo
|
|-
|Legacy: De Líder a Leyenda Tour
|Latin Rhythm Album of the Year
|
|-
!scope="row" rowspan="4"|2017
|Yandel
|Latin Rhythm Songs Artist of the Year – Solo
|
|-
|Dangerous
|Latin Rhythm Album of the Year
|
|-
|"Imaginar"
|Tropical Song of the Year
|
|-
|"El Perdedor"
|Latin Rhythm Song of the Year
|
|-
|}

Broadcast Music, Inc. Awards 

Broadcast Music, Inc. (BMI) annually hosts award shows that honor the songwriters, composers and music publishers of the year's most-performed songs in the BMI catalog.

|-
!scope="row"|2007
|Yandel
"Llamé Pa' Verte"
"Mayor Que Yo"
"Rakata"
|Latin Songwriters of the Year
|
|-
!scope="row"|2012
|Yandel
"Estoy Enamorado"
"No Me Digas Que No"
"Te Siento"
|Latin Songwriters of the Year
|
|-
!scope="row" rowspan="2"|2015
|"Hablé de Ti"
|rowspan="2"|Latin Award-Winning Songs
|
|-
|"Hasta Abajo"
|
|-
!scope="row"|2016
|"Moviendo Caderas"
|Latin Award-Winning Songs
|
|}

iHeartRadio Music Awards 

The iHeartRadio Music Awards are awarded annually by the radio network iHeartRadio in the United States. Yandel received no awards from two nominations.

|-
!scope="row" rowspan="2"|2017
|Yandel
|Latin Artist of the Year
|
|-
|"Ay Mi Dios"
|Latin Song of the Year
|
|}

International Dance Music Awards 

The International Dance Music Awards are awarded annually during the Winter Music Conference in the United States. Yandel received no awards from one nomination.

|-
!scope="row"|2014
|"Hablé de Ti"
|Best Latin Dance Track
|
|}

Latin American Music Awards 

The Latin American Music Awards are awarded annually by the television network Telemundo in the United States. Yandel received one award from seven nominations.

|-
!scope="row"|2015
|Yandel
|Favorite Urban Male Artist
|
|-
!scope="row" rowspan="6"|2016
|Yandel
|Favorite Urban Artist
|
|-
|rowspan="2"|Dangerous
|Album of the Year
|
|-
|Urban Album of the Year
|
|-
|rowspan="2"|"Encantadora"
|Song of the Year
|
|-
|Favorite Urban Song
|
|-
|"El Perdedor"
|Favorite Collaboration
|
|}

Latin Grammy Awards 

The Latin Grammy Awards are awarded annually by the Latin Academy of Recording Arts & Sciences in the United States. Yandel received two awards from five nominations.

|-
!scope="row"|2014
|De Líder a Leyenda
|Best Urban Music Album
|
|-
!scope="row" rowspan="2"|2015
|Legacy: De Líder a Leyenda Tour
|Best Urban Music Album
|
|-
|"Calentura"
|Best Urban Performance
|
|-
!scope="row" rowspan="2"|2016
|rowspan="2"|"Encantadora"
|Best Urban Song
|
|-
|Best Urban Fusion/Performance
|
|}

Latin Music Italian Awards 

The Latin Music Italian Awards are awarded annually by the Latin Music Official in Italy. Yandel received one award from twelve nominations.

|-
!scope="row" rowspan="2"|2014
|"Moviendo Caderas"
|Best Latin Male Video of The Year
|
|-
|"Hasta Abajo"
|Best Latin Urban Song of The Year
|
|-
!scope="row" rowspan="6"|2015
|Yandel
|Best Latin Alternative Artist of The Year
|
|-
|rowspan="3"|"Noche y De Día"
|Best Latin Song of The Year
|
|-
|Best Latin Male Video of The Year
|
|-
|Best Latin Dance of The Year
|
|-
|"Calentura"
|Best Latin Urban Song of The Year
|
|-
|"Como Yo Te Quiero"
|Favorite Lyrics
|
|-
!scope="row" rowspan="4"|2016
|"Encantadora"
|Best Latin Male Video of The Year
|
|-
|"Ay Mi Dios"
|Best Latin Urban Song of The Year
|
|-
|"Imaginar"
|Best Latin Urban Song of The Year
|
|-
|"El Perdedor"
|Best Latin Remix Of The Year
|
|}

Latin Songwriters Hall of Fame 

The Latin Songwriters Hall of Fame (LSHOF) is an honor by its board of directors to "educate, preserve, honor and celebrate the legacy of the greatest Latin songwriters from all over the world and their music in every genre". The LSHOF also awards The Muse Voice Award, which is given to five inductees and other special award recipients. Yandel received one award from one nomination.

|-
!scope="row"|2016
|Yandel
|The Muse Voice Hero's Award
|
|}

Lo Nuestro Awards 

The Lo Nuestro Awards are awarded annually by the television network Univision in the United States. Yandel received one award from eleven nominations.

|-
!scope="row"|2014
|"Hablé de Ti"
|Video of the Year
|
|-
!rowspan="4" scope="row"|2015
|Yandel
|Urban Artist of the Year
|
|-
|De Líder a Leyenda
|Urban Album of the Year
|
|-
|"Hasta Abajo"
|Urban Song of the Year
|
|-
|"Mi Peor Error"
|Pop Collaboration of the Year
|
|-
!scope="row"|2016
|Yandel
|Urban Artist of the Year
|
|-
!scope="row" rowspan="5"|2017
|Yandel
|Urban Artist of the Year
|
|-
|Dangerous
|Urban Album of the Year
|
|-
|"Encantadora"
|Urban Song of the Year
|
|-
|"Ay Mi Dios"
|rowspan="2"|Urban Collaboration of the Year
|
|-
|"Mayor Que Yo 3"
|
|}

Premios Juventud 

The Premios Juventud are awarded annually by the television network Univision in the United States. Yandel received no awards from two nominations.

|-
!scope="row"|2014
|Yandel
|Favorite Urban Artist
|
|-
!scope="row"|2015
|De Líder a Leyenda VIP Tour
|Favorite Concert
| 
|}

Premios Tu Mundo 

The Premios Tu Mundo are presented annually by the television network Telemundo in the United States. Yandel received no awards from one nomination.

|-
!scope="row"|2014
|Yandel
|Favorite Urban Artist
|
|}

Tecla Awards 

The Tecla Awards are presented annually by Hispanicize Media Group in the United States. Yandel received one award from one nomination.

|-
!scope="row"|2016
|Yandel
|Best Musician/Band/Group on Social Media
|
|}

See also 

List of awards and nominations received by Wisin & Yandel

References 

Yandel